The Superior Court of California, County of Yuba, also known as the Yuba County Superior Court, is the branch of the California superior court with jurisdiction over Yuba County.

History
Yuba County was one of the original counties formed in 1850 when California gained statehood.

Court was originally held in a canvas structure erected at E and Third in 1850, containing a single room  in size, and a second story used as a Masonic hall. The Court of Sessions appropriated  to purchase the St. Charles Hotel at D and Third, allocating an additional US$500 to repair it with canvas partitions. The 1855 courthouse was replaced by a new facility in 1962 and demolished in 1963.

Court is currently held in the 1962 building.

References

External links
 
 

Superior Court
Superior courts in California